Ferraz de Vasconcelos is a  municipality in the state of São Paulo in Brazil. It is part of the Metropolitan Region of São Paulo. The population is 196,500 (2020 est.) in an area of 29.56 km².

History 
Ferraz de Vasconcelos is one of the cities of São Paulo founded by immigrants.

Ferraz de Vasconcelos was founded by two Italian immigrants, Helmuth Hans Hermann and Henry Louis Baxmann Kaesemodel.

Polo Italy Grape production in Brazil, the city is a pioneer in the cultivation of fruit. The first seedlings reach the hands of Italian immigrants who fixate on site. With the coming of Japanese agriculture becomes the main economic source. Today, the town hall and public buildings of the city are baptized Palace of Grape Italy.

Geography

Location 

Ferraz de Vasconcelos is situated in the eastern region of Greater São Paulo. Altitude: 759 meters above sea level. Limits are Poa and Suzano east, São Paulo west, Mauá southwest Ribeirão Pires and south Itaquaquecetuba north .

Notable people
 Damiris Dantas do Amaral, Brazilian basketball player  
 Edmilson Carlos Abel, Brazilian footballer

External links 
 Official Page of Ferraz de Vasconcelos
 EncontraFerrazdeVasconcelos - Find everything about Ferraz de Vasconcelos city

References

Municipalities in São Paulo (state)